Karen Roberts may refer to:

Karen Roberts (television presenter), British-born television presenter
Karen Roberts (field hockey) (born 1967), retired female field hockey player from South Africa
Karen Roberts (judoka) (born 1976), British Olympic judoka
Karen Roberts (luger) (born 1954), American Olympic luger